Hunter is the third studio album by English singer-songwriter Anna Calvi, released on 31 August 2018 by Domino. The album was produced by Nick Launay, with additional production by Calvi. The album features Adrian Utley from Portishead and Martyn P. Casey from Nick Cave and The Bad Seeds.

Calvi announced the album on 6 June 2018. At the same time she released a single, "Don't Beat the Girl Out of My Boy", and announced a European tour in support. Calvi enlisted director Matt Lambert to produce the video for title track "Hunter". Dazed called it "an exploration of queer intimacy and self-love."

Critical reception

Hunter received widespread acclaim from music critics. At Metacritic, which assigns a normalised rating out of 100 to reviews from mainstream publications, the album received an average score of 84, based on 20 reviews. At The Guardian, critic Michael Hann praised Hunter as "glorious and triumphant" and "a record that succeeds on any terms you try to force upon it". Cameron Cook of Pitchfork noted Calvi's "remarkable evolution" and found that she "pushes her artistry to another level".

Track listing

Personnel
Credits adapted from the liner notes of Hunter.

Musicians
 Anna Calvi – vocals, guitar, synths, bass, piano, percussion
 Mally Harpaz – vibraphone, glockenspiel, percussion, piano
 Alex Thomas – drums, timpani, percussion
 Adrian Utley – Solina, Moog synthesizer, Oberheim synthesizer, EBow, Mellotron, Swarmatron
 Martyn Casey – bass
 Ming Vauze – bass, synths, space station FX pedals
 Gillian Rivers – viola, violin
 Fiona Brice – violin; string arrangements on "Wish"
 Ellie Stanford – violin
 Rachel Robson – viola
 Vicky Matthews – cello

Technical
 Nick Launay – production, recording, mixing
 Anna Calvi – additional production on "Indies or Paradise" and "Wish"
 Isabel Gracefield – engineering assistance
 Josh Green – engineering assistance
 Mark Knight – engineering assistance
 T. J. Allen – recording assistance
 Atom Greenspan – Satellite Xtra engineering
 Alejandro Baima – mixing engineering assistance
 Bernie Grundman – mastering

Artwork
 Imogen Snell – visual creative direction
 Maisie Cousins – photography
 Matthew Cooper – design

Charts

Notes

References

2018 albums
Albums produced by Nick Launay
Anna Calvi albums
Domino Recording Company albums